Sphaerodactylus poindexteri is a small species of gecko, a lizard in the family Sphaerodactylidae. The species is endemic to Útila, one of the Bay Islands of Honduras.

Etymology
The specific name, poindexteri, is in honor of James A. Poindexter of the USNM Support Center in Suitland, Maryland.

Habitat

References

Further reading
McCranie JR (2018). "The Lizards, Crocodiles, and Turtles of Honduras. Systematics, Distribution, and Conservation". Bulletin of the Museum of Comparative Zoology 15 (1): 1–129. 
McCranie JR, Hedges SB (2013). "Two additional new species of Sphaerodactylus (Reptilia, Squamata, Gekkonoidea, Sphaerodactylidae) from the Honduran Bay Islands". Zootaxa 3694 (1): 040–050. (Sphaerodactylus poindexteri, new species).

Sphaerodactylus
Endemic fauna of Honduras
Reptiles of Honduras
Reptiles described in 2013